The Șaeș is a left tributary of the river Târnava Mare in Romania. It discharges into the Târnava Mare in the city Sighișoara.

References

Rivers of Romania
Rivers of Mureș County